Marina is a 2012 Tamil-language comedy drama film written, produced, and directed by Pandiraj starring Sivakarthikeyan in his feature film debut with Oviya alongside, Pakkada Pandi, Gautham Purushoth. The music was composed by Girishh G. The movie released on 3 February 2012. This film won 2 Tamil Nadu State film awards for best dialogue writer and special jurie best film award. It received good reviews and had a decent run at the box-office.

Plot
Ambikapathy (Pakkada Pandi) is an orphan runaway who escapes from his cruel uncle to Chennai and eventually ends up at Marina Beach. He earns his livelihood by selling drinking water packets and later poached chickpeas to people visiting the beach. His calm and mature manners win him the admiration and later the friendship of other boys employed at the beach. Ambikapathy dreams of being educated, so he works in the day to save money for schooling whilst trying to study at night on his own. His desire to be enrolled in a proper school slowly begins to rub off on the other children on the beach. An old man (Sundararajan) and postman (Jithan Mohan) are the guardian of sorts for these street-children. The beach also attracts many lovebirds; one such couple is Senthilnathan (Sivakarthikeyan) and Swapnasundari (Oviya).

Cast

Sivakarthikeyan as Senthilnaathan (Senthil) 
Oviya as Swapnasundari (Swapna)
Pakkada Pandi as Ambikapathy
Gautham Purushoth as Kailasam
Jithan Mohan as the postman
Jaya Shri as Annamma
Sundararajan as an old man
Pasanga Senthikumari as Swapnasundari's mother
Sathish as Makudu, Senthil's friend
Sathish Kumar as a vendor
Ramesh as a courier boy 
V. Jayaprakash in a guest appearance as the school owner

Special appearances in Promotional song by :
Vikram
Prakash Raj
Sasikumar
Ameer
Sneha
Vimal

Production
Like Pandiraj's debut film Pasanga, Marina too revolves around children, focusing on street-children at Chennai's the Marina beach, who peddle snacks and knick-knacks to survive. The film is said to be inspired from Mira Nair's critically acclaimed Hindi film Salaam Bombay! (1988).

Box office
Marina opened at No.1 accounting for 51% of the takings in Chennai box office and 39% in its second weekend.The movie had a long run at the box-office.

Critical reception
Pavithra Srinivasan of Rediff.com rated Marina 3/5 stating that it is "worth a watch." Rohit Ramachandran of Nowrunning.com rated it 2/5 calling it a "failed attempt at making a companion piece to Pasanga." Sify's Moviebuzz dismissed the film as "boring." Behindwoods Review Board rated it 2.5/5 calling Marina a "pleasant beach".

Soundtrack

The soundtrack of Marina, composed by the debut music director London based musician Girishh G, was released on 9 January 2012 at the Marina Beach. The song "Vanakkam Vaazhavaikkum Chennai", penned by Na. Muthukumar, which talks about life in Chennai, would feature several noted film personalities. The songs received positive reviews.

References

External links
 

2012 films
2010s Tamil-language films
Indian children's films
Films directed by Pandiraj
Indian comedy-drama films
Films set on beaches
Child characters in film